Danilson Ricciuli (born 17 August 1982) he is an athlete who competed for Guinea-Bissau at the 2004 Summer Olympic Games in the 400m, he finished 8th in his heat and failed to advance. He also competed at the 2003 World Championships in Athletics.

References

1982 births
Living people
Bissau-Guinean male sprinters
Olympic athletes of Guinea-Bissau
Athletes (track and field) at the 2004 Summer Olympics